Mesosa maculifemorata is a species of beetle in the family Cerambycidae. It was described by Gressitt in 1940. It is known from Vietnam and China.

References

maculifemorata
Beetles described in 1940